Epicleta is a monotypic moth genus in the family Geometridae. Its single species, Epicleta calidaria, is found in the Eastern Cape of South Africa. Both the genus and species were first described by Louis Beethoven Prout in 1915.

References

Endemic moths of South Africa
Sterrhinae
Monotypic moth genera